Chaetopappa effusa,  called the spreading lazy daisy, or spreading leastdaisy, is a North American species of plants in the family Asteraceae. It has been found only in Texas, largely on the Edwards Plateau.

References

External links
Excerpts from Jim Conrad's Naturalist Newsletter photos

effusa
Endemic flora of Texas
Plants described in 1850
Taxa named by Asa Gray
Flora without expected TNC conservation status